Queenie Chu (Chu Wai Man born 22 April 1981 in British Hong Kong), is a Hong Kong television presenter and actress formerly affiliated with TVB. She was also Miss Hong Kong 2004 1st runner-up.

Biography

Chu studied in Rosaryhill School, then continued her education at the University of Washington, Seattle, United States. After finishing her studies, she entered the Miss Hong Kong 2004 pageant in Seattle.  She successfully entered the overseas group, and went back to Hong Kong in June 2004 to compete in the pageant.

Considered as a favourite from the start, she won the Tourism Ambassador title early in the competition. After 3 months of training, she competed on stage for Miss Hong Kong 2004, and eventually won the runner-up.

During her reign, she appeared in TVB variety shows. She also did a lot of charity work and visited other countries as an ambassador of Hong Kong.

In November 2004, she traveled to Sanya, China to compete in Miss World 2004, and competed in the Miss International 2005 pageant in Japan, and won the Miss Friendship Award.

She signed an artist contract and hosted more shows for TVB, with Chu's most notable role as Alex Wan in the sitcom Come Home Love (2012-2015), before ending her career at TVB in 2016 to pursue more freelance opportunities in film and television.

Chu married Jason Chan, a cardiology doctor working Hong Kong Sanatorium & Hospital in 2021. The two were married at the Peninsula Hotel with a few attendees due to COVID-19 pandemic. Chu is also a licensed therapist after studying clinical hypnotherapy for a year and  a half.

Awards
 Miss Hong Kong 2004: runner up
 Miss Hong Kong 2004: Tourism Ambassador
 Miss International 2005: Miss Friendship

Filmography

TV series

Films

References

External links
 Official TVB Blog of Queenie Chu
 
 
 HK cinemagic entry

 	 

|-
! colspan="3" style="background: #DAA520;" | Miss Hong Kong

1981 births
Living people
Hong Kong beauty pageant winners
Hong Kong film actresses
Hong Kong television actresses
Miss International 2005 delegates
Miss World 2004 delegates
University of Washington alumni